The pound was the currency of the Republic of Ireland until 2002. Its ISO 4217 code was IEP, and the symbol was £ (or IR£ for distinction). The Irish pound was replaced by the euro on 1 January 1999. Euro currency did not begin circulation until the beginning of 2002.

First pound

The earliest Irish coinage was introduced in the late 10th century, with an £sd system of one pound divided into twenty shillings, each of twelve silver pence. Parity with sterling was established by King John around 1210, so that Irish silver could move freely into the English economy and help to finance his wars in France. However, from 1460, Irish coins were minted with a different silver content than those of England, so that the values of the two currencies diverged.

During the Williamite War of 1689–1691, King James II, no longer reigning in England and Scotland, issued an emergency base-metal coinage known as gun money.

In 1701, the relationship between the Irish pound and sterling was fixed at £13 Irish to 12 GBP (The Pound Scots had yet another value; it was absorbed into sterling in 1707 at a ratio of 12 to 1.) This relationship made it possible for Irish copper coins to circulate with English silver coins, since thirteen Irish pence had the same value as one shilling sterling.

In 1801, the Kingdom of Ireland became part of the United Kingdom, but the Irish pound continued to circulate until January 1826. Between 1804 and 1813, silver tokens worth 10d were issued by the Bank of Ireland and were denominated in pence Irish. The last copper coins of the Irish pound were minted in 1823, and in 1826 the Irish pound was merged with the pound sterling. After 1826, some Irish banks continued to issue paper currency, but these were denominated in sterling, and no more distinctly Irish coins were minted until the creation of the Irish Free State in the 20th century.

Second pound

pound
From continuing to use sterling after its independence (1922), the new Irish Free State introduced its own currency from 1928. The new Free State pound was defined by the 1927 Act to have exactly the same weight and fineness of gold as did the sovereign at the time, having the effect of making the new currency pegged at 1:1 with sterling.  rather than  parity with sterling was maintained for another fifty years. Distinctive coins and notes were introduced, the coins from 1928 (in eight denominations: d, d, 1d, 3d, 6d, shilling (1/–), florin (2/–), half crown (2/6) and in 1966 a 10/– coin, a commemorative piece not meant for circulation) all but the 3d and 6d had the same dimensions as their British counterparts, the Irish coins being thicker nickel coins in contrast to the thin silver ones issued in the UK. However, sterling specie generally continued to be accepted on a one-for-one basis everywhere, whereas Irish coin was not generally accepted in the United Kingdom, except in parts of Northern Ireland.

Irish pound
The name of the state was officially changed to "Ireland" on the coming into force of the Constitution of Ireland on 29 December 1937. On 10 May 1938, the name of the currency became the Irish pound.

Decimalisation
The Report of the Metric System and Decimal Coinage Committee (1959) was amongst the first formal reports on decimalisation of the currency, discussion continued into the 1960s on the topic. When the British government decided to decimalise its currency, the Irish government followed suit. The Decimal Currency Act 1969 replaced the traditional shilling and penny with a centesimal subdivision, the "new penny" (symbol: p). The pound itself was not revalued by this act and therefore banknotes were unaffected, although the 10/– note was replaced by a coin due to spiralling inflation. The new five pence coin correlated with the old 1/– coin, and the new 10 pence coin correlated with the old 2/– coin. New coins were issued of the same dimensions and materials as the corresponding new British coins. The Decimal Currency Act 1970 made additional provisions for the changeover not related with the issue of coins.

Decimalisation was overseen by the Irish Decimal Currency Board, created on 12 June 1968. It provided changeover information to the public, including a pamphlet called Everyone's Guide to Decimal Currency. The changeover occurred on Decimal Day, 15 February 1971.

Breaking the link with sterling
The European Monetary System was introduced in the 1970s. Ireland decided to join it in 1978, while the United Kingdom stayed out.

The European Exchange Rate Mechanism finally broke the one-for-one link that existed between the Irish pound and the pound sterling; by 30 March 1979 an exchange rate was introduced.

This period also saw the creation of the Currency Centre at Sandyford in 1978, where banknotes and coinage could be manufactured within the state. Prior to this, banknotes were printed by specialist commercial printers in England, and coins were struck by the British Royal Mint.

1979–1999: Free-floating currency 
Until 1986, all decimal Irish coins were the same shape and size as their UK counterparts. After this, however, all new denominations or redesigned coins were of different sizes to the UK coinage. The new 20p coin introduced that year and the £1 coin (introduced in 1990) were completely different in size, shape and composition from the previously introduced UK versions. When the UK 5p and 10p coins were reduced in size, the Irish followed suit, but the new Irish 10p was smaller than the new UK version introduced in 1992 and the new Irish 5p was slightly larger than the UK version introduced in 1990. The Irish 50p was never reduced in size (as it was in the UK in 1997).

Despite not being legal tender, British sterling coins of the same shape and size were customarily accepted in Ireland. At time of the replacement with the euro, these were the 1p, 2p and 5p (although it was not exactly the same as the British 5p).

Replacement with the euro

On 31 December 1998, the exchange rates between the European Currency Unit and the Irish pound and 10 other EMS currencies (all but the pound sterling, the Swedish krona and the Danish krone) were fixed. The fixed conversion factor for the Irish pound was EUR1.00 = IEP0.787564. Of the 15 national currencies originally tied to the euro (including the currencies of Vatican City, Monaco and San Marino), the Irish pound was the only one whose conversion factor was less than 1, i.e. the unit of the national currency was worth more than one euroalmost EUR1.27 in this case.

Although the euro became the currency of the eurozone countries including Ireland on 1 January 1999, it was not until 1 January 2002 that the state began to withdraw Irish pound coins and notes, replacing them with euro notes and coins. All other eurozone countries withdrew their currencies in a similar fashion, from that date. Irish pound coins and notes ceased to be legal tender on 9 February 2002. All Irish coins and banknotes, from the start of the Irish Free State onwards, both decimal and pre-decimal, may be redeemed for euros at Ireland's Central Bank in Dublin.

See also

Banknotes of the Republic of Ireland
Coins of the Republic of Ireland
Commemorative coins of Ireland
Irish euro coins
Economy of the Republic of Ireland

References

External links
 A guide to valuing all your old Irish coins
Irish banknotes
Irish coinage website – history, images and catalogue.
Overview of Irish pound from the BBC
The Irish Pound: From Origins to EMU  (734K PDF file, from Central Bank website).
Historical banknotes of Ireland 

Currencies of the British Empire
Currencies of the Commonwealth of Nations
Currencies with multiple banknote issuers
Currencies of the Republic of Ireland
Economic history of Ireland
Modern obsolete currencies
Currencies replaced by the euro
2002 disestablishments in Ireland
1928 establishments in Ireland
Central Bank of Ireland